Mount Digine Rural LLG is a local-level government (LLG) of Chimbu Province, Papua New Guinea.

Wards
01. Gorma
02. Kel
03. Korokea
04. Digibe
05. Sipagul
06. Genabona
07. Kariglmaril
08. Gaima
09. Munuma
10. Oldale
11. Oldale 1
12. Oldale 2

References

Local-level governments of Chimbu Province